Danila Comastri Montanari (born in Bologna, 4 November 1948) is an Italian historical mystery fiction writer. She has written the Publius Aurelius Statius series.

Biography 
Graduated in pedagogy and political sciences, for twenty years she has been teaching and continuing to make regular trips.

In 1990 she wrote her first novel,  Mors Tua  and since then she has devoted herself full time to the narrative, favoring the genre of historical mystery, which allows her to reconcile her main interests: the study of the past (in particular ancient civilizations) and the love for mystery weaves.

Starting from 1990 she has been writing historical detective stories focused on the figure of Publio Aurelio Stazio, noble senator of the Rome of Claudio (mid 1st century AD). At the moment 19 novels have been published.

In addition to the series of Publio Aurelio, Comastri Montanari has written other novels and short stories set in different historical periods. In February 2007 she published the essay Giallo antico. How to write a historical detective story, published by Hobby & Work, on the topic of the same name: the appendix contains the stories Pirates of the Chersonese,  Assassination at the temple of Vesta and  Il giallo del snake.

Bibliography
Publius Aurelius series

1990 – Mors tua
1991 – In corpore sano
1993 – Cave canem
1994 – Morituri te salutant
1996 – Parce sepulto
1997 – Cui prodest?
1999 – Spes ultima dea
2000 – Scelera
2001 – Gallia est
2002 – Saturnalia
2003 – Ars moriendi – Un'indagine a Pompei
2004 – Olympia – Un'indagine ai giochi ellenici
2005 – Tenebrae
2007 – Nemesis
2009 – Dura Lex
2011 – Tabula Rasa
2013 – Pallida Mors
2015 - Saxa rubra 
2017 - Ludus in fabula 

Standalone novels
1995 – Ricette per un delitto
1996 – La campana dell'arciprete
1997 – Il panno di Mastro Gervaso
1999 – Una strada giallo sangue
2003 – Istigazione a delinquere
2008 – Terrore

References

1948 births
Living people
Writers from Bologna
Italian women writers
Italian historical novelists
Writers of historical mysteries
Writers of historical fiction set in antiquity